John Jacob Mortvedt (January 25, 1932 – March 13, 2012) was an American soil scientist who worked with micronutrient fertilizer.

Early life and education
Born and raised on a Dell Rapids, South Dakota, farm to Ernest and Clara Mortvedt, John Mortvedt earned a bachelor's degree in agronomy from South Dakota State University in 1953. After a brief return to the farm, Mortvedt was a pilot for a US Army aviation unit stationed in Colorado, between World War II and the Korean War. He married Marlene Fodness in Rapid City, South Dakota, on January 23, 1955. Mortvedt studied for a master's degree in soil science from SDSU and graduated in 1959, continuing for his Ph.D. in soil chemistry from the University of Wisconsin–Madison in 1962. Mortvedt wrote his thesis on “the effect of manganese and copper on the growth of Streptomyces scabies and the incidence of potato scab.”

Career
John Mortvedt joined the Tennessee Valley Authority (TVA) and worked in Muscle Shoals, Alabama, for thirty years. While at TVA he also collaborated with the Department of Agriculture's Agricultural Research Service. Mortvedt earned the TVA Bronze Award as a soil chemist in the Agricultural Research Department. A senior scientist in Alabama until 1992, John transferred to the TVA Field Programs Department in Colorado to be a regional manager for the Rocky Mountain region. Mortvedt retired from TVA on July 9, 1993, and joined Colorado State University as an Extension Specialist and Professor Emeritus. At Colorado State University, Mortvedt supervised fertilizer suggestion revisions for the state's major crops.

Mortvedt was elected president of the Soil Science Society of America and served on its board of directors, executive committee, and as its editor-in-chief. He was awarded fellowships in the American Association for the Advancement of Science (1989), American Society of Agronomy, and Soil Science Society of America.

Legacy
After his death in 2012, the Micronutrient Manufacturers Association named its Mortvedt Award in honor of John, calling him the "leading researcher and educator on micronutrients in crop production".

Bibliography
In addition to two patents, John Mortvedt published more than 100 papers and book chapters. Among them are:

References

Aviators from South Dakota
American soil scientists
People from Dell Rapids, South Dakota
People from Fort Collins, Colorado
People from Florence, Alabama
1932 births
2012 deaths
South Dakota State University alumni
University of Wisconsin–Madison alumni
Fellows of the American Association for the Advancement of Science
Military personnel from South Dakota